Laura Marie Müller (born 11 December 1995) is a German sprinter. She competed in the 4×400 meters relay at the 2016 European Athletics Championships. At the 2016 Summer Olympics, she competed in the women's 4x400 meter relay.

Education
Müller attended Gymnasium am Rotenbühl, and completed her abitur in 2015. She then began studying psychology at Saarland University.

References

External links
 

1995 births
Living people
German female sprinters
Sportspeople from Saarbrücken
Olympic athletes of Germany
Athletes (track and field) at the 2016 Summer Olympics
Athletes (track and field) at the 2020 Summer Olympics